Tomichi Dome rises north of U.S. Highway 50 west of Hot Springs Creek and south of Waunita Hot Springs Reservoir in the southeast quarter of Gunnison County, Colorado. It is situated within the Gunnison National Forest.

Geology
Tomichi Dome is a prominent igneous mountain formed during the Tertiary. The predominant rock is rhyolite, but microgranite, breccia, and tuff have been cited as present. Surrounding the mountain, on the valley floor, is Mancos Shale, a Mesozoic sedimentary rock.

Tomchi Dome has been described as an intrusion and also as an extrusive, volcanic feature. As an intrusion, the pluton may have formed when magma was intruded into the Mancos Shale resulting in a laccolith. Given the fine-grained texture of the rock, the laccolith is assumed to have been at a shallow depth and cooled rapidly. Venting may have been associated with the intrusion resulting in the rhyolytic breccia and tuff documented in the vicinity. Shallow rhyolitic plutons southwest of Tomichi Dome, in the San Juan Mountains near Lake City, have also been described as laccoliths.

A flow or dome of topaz rhyolite overlies the tuff.

Whether plutonic or volcanic, Tomichi Dome is possibly one of a string of igneous structures associated with the Rio Grande Rift, which stretches from Mexico to Colorado.

Historical names
Tomichi Dome – 1907 
Tumitche Dome

See also

List of Colorado mountain ranges
List of Colorado mountain summits
List of Colorado fourteeners
List of Colorado 4000 meter prominent summits
List of the most prominent summits of Colorado
List of Colorado county high points

Notes

Maps:
Gunnison Basin Public Lands. Forest Service Series Map. United States Department of Agriculture. Colorado, 2008.

External links

Mountains of Colorado
Mountains of Gunnison County, Colorado
North American 3000 m summits
Geologic domes
Rock formations of Colorado